The Cannon 102/45 was a naval gun of the Italian Navy in World War II, which was later modified for shore based anti-aircraft and coastal artillery roles.

History 
During World War I the United Kingdom delivered a QF 4 inch Mk V naval gun, serial No.974 to Italy to act as a template for licensed production by the Ansaldo Company.  The Mark V was constructed of a tapered inner A tube, A tube, taper wound wire, full-length jacket and breech ring.  It had either a horizontal or vertical sliding breech block, with semi-automatic action and used fixed quick-fire ammunition.  There were three models produced: Schneider-Armstrong Model 1917, Schneider-Armstrong Model 1919, and Schneider-Canet Model 1917; each with differing mounts and elevations.  Overall the 102/45 was considered a successful design and it was widely used on destroyers of the Italian Navy before and during World War II.  The exception being the Schneider-Armstrong Model 1919 which was an unsatisfactory twin mount with both guns sharing a common cradle.  The Model 1919 was later replaced by single mounts during the war.  The 102/45 was in the process of being replaced by the Cannon 120/45 and 120/50 when World War II began.  Starting in 1937 guns that were removed from ships were mounted on new dual-purpose shore mounts and used as anti-aircraft guns and coastal artillery until retired in 1945.

Interesting facts 
 The reported muzzle velocities for the Schneider-Armstrong  and Schneider-Canet  are slightly different.
 The muzzle velocities of the 102/45 are higher than the Mk V  implying greater working pressure.  What effect this had on barrel life and accuracy is unknown.
 The rates of fire for the 102/45 (7 rpm) and Mk V (8-10 rpm) are different.

Types

Notes

Bibliography 
 
 
 

 

Naval guns of Italy
World War II artillery of Italy
World War II naval weapons
Anti-aircraft guns of Italy
Coastal artillery
100 mm artillery